Killer is a 1998 French-Kazakhstani crime drama film directed by Darezhan Omirbaev.

Plot
Marat (Talgat Assetov) is a chauffeur who, following a traffic accident, finds himself in debt. When his baby becomes ill, he agrees to murder a journalist in order to earn some money.

Cast
Talgat Assetov as Marat
Roksana Abouova as Aijan

Awards
Killer won the Un Certain Regard Award at the 1998 Cannes Film Festival. At the Karlovy Vary International Film Festival, it won the Don Quijote Award - Special Mention and was nominated for the Crystal Globe.

References

External links

 

1998 films
1998 crime drama films
French crime drama films
Kazakhstani crime drama films
1990s Russian-language films
French gangster films
Films directed by Darezhan Omirbaev
1990s French films